Ibrahima Tandia (born 12 July 1993) is a  professional footballer who plays as a midfielder for Kuwaiti club Qadsia. Born in France, he represents Mali at international level.

Club career
Born in Longjumeau, Tandia began his career playing for local amateur clubs in Paris before joining professional club Sochaux in 2006. After five years with the club, Tandia joined Caen on a three-year deal, despite reported interest from English clubs Newcastle United and Chelsea. He was assigned the number 26 shirt and made his professional debut on 28 August 2011 appearing as a substitute in a 3–2 defeat to Rennes.

On 28 June 2019, Tandia was transferred from Sepsi OSK Sfântu Gheorghe to Al-Hazem for 600,000.

On 1 September 2021, Tandia joined Al-Adalah on loan.

On 22 August 2022, Tandia joined Libyan club Al-Ahli Tripoli.

On 28 December 2022, Tandia joined Qadsia.

International career
Tandia was born and raised in France and is of Malian and Senegalese descent. At international level, Tandia was a France youth international having represented his nation at under-16 and under-17 level. Tandia was called up to the Mali national under-20 football team for the 2016 Toulon Tournament, and made his debut in a 1–0 loss to the Czech Republic U20s. Tandia scored his first goal in a 3–3 tie with the Mexico U23s in the same tournament.

He made his debut for Mali national football team on 26 March 2019 in a friendly against Senegal, as a 73rd-minute substitute for Moussa Doumbia.

Career statistics

Club

Honours
Al-Hazem
MS League: 2020–21

References

External links
 
 
 
 

1993 births
Living people
People from Longjumeau
Footballers from Essonne
Association football midfielders
Malian footballers
Mali under-20 international footballers
Mali international footballers
French footballers
France youth international footballers
French sportspeople of Senegalese descent
French sportspeople of Malian descent
Ligue 1 players
Stade Malherbe Caen players
Al-Hazem F.C. players
CS Sfaxien players
Al-Adalah FC players
Al-Ahli SC (Tripoli) players
Qadsia SC players
Ligue 2 players
Tours FC players
Liga I players
Sepsi OSK Sfântu Gheorghe players
Saudi Professional League players
Saudi First Division League players
Tunisian Ligue Professionnelle 1 players
Kuwait Premier League players
Libyan Premier League players
French expatriate footballers
Malian expatriate footballers
French expatriate sportspeople in Romania
Malian expatriate sportspeople in Romania
Expatriate footballers in Romania
French expatriate sportspeople in Saudi Arabia
Malian expatriate sportspeople in Saudi Arabia
Expatriate footballers in Saudi Arabia
French expatriate sportspeople in Tunisia
Malian expatriate sportspeople in Tunisia
Expatriate footballers in Tunisia
Malian expatriate sportspeople in Libya
Expatriate footballers in Libya
Malian expatriate sportspeople in Kuwait
Expatriate footballers in Kuwait